Alejandro Yepes Balsalobre  (born 12 March 1989), commonly known as Álex, is a Spanish futsal player who plays for  San Giuseppe as a Pivot.

External links
LNFS profile
UEFA profile

1989 births
Living people
Spanish men's futsal players
ElPozo Murcia FS players
People from Cieza, Murcia
Sportspeople from the Region of Murcia